Aamina Sheikh is an American-Pakistani actress, songwriter and former fashion model. Sheikh has received critical appreciation for her work in the Urdu television series and art films, and is the recipient of four Lux Style Award from nine nominations.
 
Born in New York City and raised in Karachi and Riyadh, Sheikh studied video production at the Hampshire College. After working as an assistant at the Curious Pictures, she returned to Pakistan and started her career as a fashion model, during which she was a spokesperson for the French brand L'Oreal and received a Lux Style Award for Best Model nomination. She then featured as the female lead in the 2008 television film Baarish Mein Deewar and the Geo TV series Dil e Nadan, for which she received the Lux Style Award for Best Emerging Talent. Sheikh had roles in several series, including Daam (2010), Maat (2010), Uraan (2010), Mera Saaein (2010), Main Abdul Qadir Hoon (2010), Mera Saaein 2 (2012), Mirat Ul Uroos (2013) and Jackson Heights (2014).

Sheikh made her film debut with the 2012 acclaimed social drama Seedlings. Her performance in the film garnered critical appreciation and earned her many national and international awards, including the Lux Style Award for Best Film Actress, New York Film Festival Award and SAARC Film Festival Award. She achieved further success for the role of Zarnab in the romance Armaan (2013) and subsequently starred in the social drama Josh: Independence Through Unity (2014), a critical and commercial success. Sheikh was widely praised for her role and received nominations in the Best Actress category at the Lux Style Awards and the Silent River Film Festival. Her greatest commercial success came with the family drama Cake (2018). In 2015, she served as one of the committee member of the Pakistani Academy Selection Committee.

Life and career 
After returning to Pakistan, Sheikh landed a job with Geo Television, where she directed and produced the children talk show, called Bachey Man Ke Sachey. In 2007, Sheikh made her on-screen debut in Sharjil Baloch and Khalid Ahmed's telefilm, Gurmuch Singh ki Waseeyat. It was based on Saadat Hassan Manto's novel, The Will of Gurmukh Singh. She subsequently garnered international recognition as a spokesperson for the French beauty brand L'Oreal.

In 2008, Sheikh appeared in three major telefilms: Aasmaan Chu Lay, Pachees Qadam Pe Maut and Baarish Mein Deewar. Sheikh played a rickshaw driver who's determined to become the sole breadwinner of the family, in Syed Ali Reza's Aasmaan Chu Lay. Sheikh had to learn and drive a rickshaw on Karachi's busiest M.A. Jinnah road and Garden Area, with a massive camera attached to it and had to attract real passengers. In the same year, Sheikh made her runaway debut with Rehana Saigol's fashion show. She has done extensive print work for fashion designers, such as Deepak Perwani, Amir Adnan, Nomi Ansari, Niche Lifestyle, Khaadi, Teejays, The Men's Store, Fahad Hussayn, Hang Ten, Maheen Khan, Umbereen Sharmeen, Chinyere, Crossroads and Limited Edition. In the following year, she did her second photoshoot for Niche Lifestyle, with  Atif Aslam. Her performances in the romantic series Agar Tum Na Hote (2009), Umm-e-Kalsoom (2011), and Kuch Is Tarah (2013), earned her Satellite Best Actress and Best Actress Terrestrial nominations at Lux Style Awards. She achieved further critical and commercial success for her role of portrayal of Zarnab, in the romance Armaan (2013), which earned her a nomination for the Tarang Housefull Award for Best Actress.

In 2011, Sheikh played the role of a grieving mother in Summer Nicks-produced multi award-winning feature film Seedlings and went on to win New York Film Festival Award for Best Actress and SAARC Film Festival Award for Best Actress. She then went on to play the lead in Iram Parveen Bilal's feature art film Josh: Independence Through Unity, before taking on the role of Natasha in the high-octane action spy thriller, Operation 021, produced by Zeba Bakhtiar and directed by Australian filmmaker, Summer Nicks. In 2013, Sheikh was awarded Miss Photogenic Award at the Veet Celebration of Beauty Awards. In 2018, she starred in Asim Abbasi's drama film Cake, alongside Sanam Saeed, which was a major critical and commercial success. The film earned her a Best Actress nomination at the Lux Style Awards.

Sheikh married actor Mohib Mirza, at Karachi. Their wedding was a three-day event taking place from 30 April to 2 May 2005. Mirza and Sheikh met on the sets of a show which Mirza was hosting and she was directing. In an interview given to Jang, Mirza revealed that he had the hardest time convincing Sheikh's father and that each meeting with him involved "extensive grilling". They have a daughter together, Meissa, born in 2015. The two announced their separation in 2018 and were divorced in 2019. Sheikh remarried to a businessman in August 2020.

Filmography

Films

Television

Awards and nominations

Lux Style Awards

See also
 List of Pakistani actresses

References

External links

 
 

Living people
Pakistani television actresses
Pakistani female models
Actresses from Karachi
Pakistani film actresses
Actresses from New York City
American television actresses
21st-century Pakistani actresses
American film actors of Pakistani descent
American models of Pakistani descent
St Joseph's Convent School, Karachi alumni
1981 births
21st-century American women